Ty - supermodel, Cycle 4 was the fourth and final Cycle of the Russian reality show on the STS  TV channel, a competition of non-professional aspiring models. The host was presenter Svetlana Bondarchuk, the wife of Fyodor Bondarchuk who presented the first two cycles of the series.

In each episode the thirteen chosen finalists, who lived in a house together in Moscow, faced different competitions in modeling, sports and entertainment with an elimination round at the end of each episode where one of them was sent home. This cycle did not have a double elimination in its entire Series. At the end of the show, 18-year-old Tatyana Krokhina from Krasnodar became the winner of the competition and won a contract worth $250,000 with Point Models, an international modelling contract with Ford Models and a brand new Chevrolet.

Episode Guide

Episode 1
Original airdate: October 6, 2007

 Bottom two: Irina Galushkina & Marta Georgieva
 Eliminated: Marta Georgieva
 Featured photographer: Vladimir Glynin
 Guest judges: Tatiana Mikhalkova, Andrey Sharov

Episode 2
 Original airdate: October 13, 2007
 Reward challenge winners: Yulya Zavyalova, Darya Sverchkova
 Bottom two: Dana Borisenko & Anya Belova
 Eliminated: Anya Belova
 Featured photographer: Dmitry Zhuravlev
 Special guests: Evgeny Vlasov, Valentin Yudashkin, Irakli Pirtskhalava
 Guest judges: Tatiana Mikhalkova, Andrey Sharov

Episode 3
Original airdate: October 20, 2007

 Reward challenge winner: Yulya Zavyalova
 Bottom two: Dana Borisenko & Aleksandra Lobanova
 Eliminated: Dana Borisenko 
 Featured photographer: Dmitry Zhuravlev
 Special guest: Masha Zheleznyakova 
 Guest judges: Tatiana Mikhalkova, Elena Ermolaeva

Episode 4
 Original airdate: October 27, 2007
 Bottom two: Yulya Kuchina & Irina Tokareva
 Eliminated: Irina Tokareva
 Featured photographer: Vladimir Glynin
 Special guests: Andrej Merkurev, Daria Razumikhina, Dmitriy Dobrovolskiy
 Guest judges: Aleksandar Pushnov, Tatiana Mikhalkova

Episode 5
Original airdate: November 3, 2007

 Reward challenge winner: Yulya Kuchina
 Bottom two: Anastasia Bogushevskaya & Yulya Zavyalova
 Eliminated: Anastasia Bogushevskaya 
 Featured photographer: Dmitry Zhuravlev
 Special guest: Mikhail Fedoruk 
 Guest judges: Yegor Druzhin, Tatiana Mikhalkova

Episode 6
Original airdate: November 10, 2007

 Reward challenge winner: Tatyana Krokhina
 Bottom two: Irina Galushkina & Yulya Zavyalova
 Eliminated: Yulya Zavyalova
 Featured photographer: Dmitry Zhuravlev
 Guest judges: Sergey Glushko, Svetlana Masterkova

Episode 7
Original airdate: November 17, 2007

 Reward challenge winner: Alya Kuptsova
 Bottom two: Tatyana Krokhina & Darya Sverchkova
 Eliminated: Darya Sverchkova
 Featured photographer: Vladimir Glynin
 Special guest: Natalia Ragozina, Marina Kuptsova
 Guest judges: Pierre Nartsiss, Julia Dalakian, Sergey Antonov

Episode 8
Original airdate: November 24, 2007

 Reward challenge winner: Lyudmila Krimer
 Bottom two: Irina Galushkina & Lyudmila Krimer
 Eliminated: Lyudmila Krimer
 Featured photographer: Dmitriy Zhuravlev
 Special guest: Andrey Noskov
 Guest judges: Sergey Antonov, Olga Slutsker

Episode 9
Original airdate: December 1, 2007

 Reward challenge winner: Aleksandra Lobanova
 Bottom two: Irina Galushkina & Alya Kuptsova
 Eliminated: Irina Galushkina 
 Featured photographer: Vladimir Glynin
 Special guest: Natalia Cherkasova
 Guest judges: Vlad Topalov, Arkady Ukupnik, Elena Ermolaeva

Episode 10
Original airdate: December 8, 2007

 Reward challenge winner: Tatyana Krokhina
 Bottom two: Yulya Kuchina & Aleksandra Lobanova
 Eliminated: Aleksandra Lobanova
 Featured photographer: Vladimir Glynin
 Special guests: Valentin Yudashkin, Maria Shikareva
 Guest judges: Dmitriy Dibrov, Aleksandar Pushnov, Elena Ermolaeva

Episode 11
Original airdate: December 15, 2007

After the departure of Sasha the final 3 were taken to their individual challenges: The Go-Sees. Alya was not hesitating to open a bottle of champagne when entering the car and as she would have known she happened to win the challenge and got to see her chubby boyfriend.

At a luxurious dinner the remaining girls get told by Svetlana that they should enjoy the meal as they cannot eat that much when becoming serious working models in the business. Early next morning it was time for the weekly photo shoot where the girls were styled with diamonds and elegant wardrobe. Tatiana was able to impress Vladimir Glynin the most. As an individual reward for her back, Yulya K. received a massage as she was having troubles with it through the competition.

At the judging panel the girls had to perform an advertising for an energy drink on roller blades where all three of them struggled much to the pleasure of the panel. As she delivered the best photo of the week Tatiana made the final round as first. It then was announced that the other two girls also made it to the final week and everyone remained in the competition.

 Reward challenge winner: Alya Kuptsova
 Bottom two: Yulya Kuchina & Alya Kuptsova
 Eliminated: No contestant was eliminated
 Featured photographer: Vladimir Glynin
 Guest judges: Anton Makarskiy, Olga Slutsker, Tatiana Mikhalkov

Episode 12
Original airdate: December 22, 2007

The challenge marathon for the final week kicked off with a funky photoshoot on which the remaining three where styled in evening dresses. They were then deported to St. Petersburg for the final runway show by Valentin Yudashkin for which Yulya K. is given extensions.

Back in Moscow the three finalists faced the judging panel for the very last time. The jury considered the final photoshoot and their walks on the runway. However their entire performances during the competition were also evaluated and made Tatyana Krokhina the winner, whom according to the judges made the biggest progress during the show.

 Final three: Alya Kuptsova, Tatyana Krokhina & Yulya Kuchina
 Ty - Supermodel: Tatyana Krokhina
 Featured photographer: Vladimir Glynin
 Special guests: Valentin Yudashkin, Lubov Grechishnikova, Andrey Sharov
 Guest judges: Konstantin Samarin, Elena Ermolaeva, Tatiana Mikhalkova, Sergey Zverev, Vladimir Glynin

Contestants
(ages stated are at start of contest)

Summaries

Call-out order

 The contestant was eliminated
 The contestant was part of a non-elimination bottom two
 The contestant won the competition

 In episode 4, Aleksandra, Darya, and Yulya Z's names were not called at panel.
 Episode 11 featured a non-elimination bottom two.

Photo Shoot Guide
Episode 1 Photo Shoot: Topless on Car 
Episode 2 Photo Shoot: Construction Building
Episode 3 Photo Shoot: Rock Climbing 
Episode 4 Photo Shoot: Ballet Couple 
Episode 5 Photo Shoot: Steam in a Locker Room 
Episode 6 Photo Shoot: Jumping in Shop Window 
Episode 7 Photo Shoot: Couples in a Bedroom 
Episode 8 Photo Shoot: Water Nymphs 
Episode 9 Photo Shoot: Devoted Maidens 
Episode 10 Photo Shoot: Disco Fever 
Episode 11 Photo Shoot: Beauty Shoot with Jewels 
Episode 12 Photo Shoot: Haute Couture

Judges
Svetlana Bondarchuk (Host)
Dmitry Zhuravlev
Elena Myasnikova
Tatiana Mikhalkova
Vladimir Glynin

References

Official website through internet archive

Top Model series (Russia)
2007 Russian television seasons